Danube-Ipoly National Park is one of the most diverse national parks in Hungary.

Background
In 1997, the park was created from Pilis and Börzsöny national parks, with the addition of part of the floodplain of the River Ipoly. This park encompasses areas in Budapest, Pest County, Komárom-Esztergom County and Fejér County. Its offices are in Budapest and in the Jókai garden (Budapest XII), and its headquarters are in Esztergom.

Some species – both flora and fauna – have their sole habitat in this park, and there is a programme to save these rare and endangered species.

References

External links

Esztergom
National parks of Hungary
Geography of Komárom-Esztergom County
Tourist attractions in Komárom-Esztergom County
Geography of Pest County
Tourist attractions in Pest County
Geography of Fejér County
Tourist attractions in Fejér County
Geography of Budapest
Tourist attractions in Budapest
Protected areas established in 1997
1997 establishments in Hungary